Alpha Lambda Tau was a men's college fraternity founded in 1916 at Oglethorpe University. For its first decade Alpha Lambda Tau permitted expansion only within the southern states.

History
Being of southern origin, it was originally decided that the fraternity would not expand north of the Mason–Dixon line. By , the anti-northern expansion policy was met with disapproval at the fraternity's national convention.

Merger with ΤΚΕ
In , the national organization of Alpha Lambda Tau dissolved. Five of the eight chapters that were active in  merged with Tau Kappa Epsilon. Several chapters went to other national fraternities.

Chapters
These were the chapters of Alpha Lambda Tau.  Those active at the time of the merger are noted in bold, those inactive are noted in italics. Where chapters affiliated with  their status is noted as "Merged"; where they joined other fraternities they are listed as "Withdrawn".

Notes

References

Student organizations established in 1916
Student societies in the United States
Defunct former members of the North American Interfraternity Conference
1916 establishments in Georgia (U.S. state)